The Educational Institute of Scotland (EIS) is the oldest teachers' trade union in the world, having been founded in 1847 when dominies became concerned about the effect of changes to the system of education in Scotland on their professional status.    The EIS is  the largest teaching union in Scotland, representing 80% of the country's teachers and lecturers.  it has 54,580 members.

General Secretaries
Hugh Cameron
1921: Tom Henderson
1941: John Wishart
1945: Alexander J. Belford
1952: William Campbell
1960: Gilbert Stewart Bryden
1975: John D. Pollock
1988: Jim Martin
1995: Ronnie Smith
2012: Larry Flanagan
2022: Andrea Bradley

Scottish Educational Journal
The Scottish Educational Journal (SEJ) is the magazine of the EIS, which has been appearing, formerly in tabloid format, since ca. 1917.

Fellowships

Since being granted a royal charter by Queen Victoria, it is the only union able to award degrees. A recipient of the EIS degree is a Fellow of the Educational Institute of Scotland, denoted by the post-nominal FEIS.

An early example of such a degree (awarded in December 1847) was worded as follows:

Industrial action 
Threats of industrial action by the EIS  evoke memories for many of the long-running teacher strikes of the 1980s  During the 1984-86 industrial action almost 15 million pupil days were lost across Scotland. It was a sustained campaign of industrial action in  Scottish education in opposition to the  Conservative Government. Larry Flanagan has described it as “the first time that any group of workers, anywhere in the UK, successfully stood firm in defiance of a concerted, ideologically driven attack by the Tory government.”

External links

References 

1847 establishments in Scotland
Trade unions in Scotland
Educational organisations based in Scotland
Education International
Organisations based in Edinburgh with royal patronage
Education trade unions
Trade unions established in the 1840s
Teacher associations based in the United Kingdom
Professional associations based in Scotland
Secondary education in Scotland
Podcasting companies
Trade unions affiliated with the Trades Union Congress